Katia Benth (born 16 November 1975 in Cayenne) is a retired sprinting athlete from French Guiana, who represented France in international competitions.

Achievements

References
  Profile

1975 births
Living people
French people of French Guianan descent
French Guianan female sprinters
French female sprinters
World Athletics Championships medalists
European Athletics Championships medalists
Universiade medalists in athletics (track and field)
Sportspeople from Cayenne
Universiade silver medalists for France
Universiade bronze medalists for France
Medalists at the 1997 Summer Universiade
Medalists at the 1999 Summer Universiade
Medalists at the 2001 Summer Universiade